Trestonia turbula is a species of beetle in the family Cerambycidae. It was described by Monné and Fragoso in 1984. It is known from French Guiana, Ecuador, Brazil and Peru.

References

turbula
Beetles described in 1984